The 1900 Carlisle Indians football team represented the Carlisle Indian Industrial School as an independent during the 1900 college football season. Led by second-year head coach Pop Warner, the Indians compiled a record of 6–4–1 and outscored opponents 207 to 92.

Carlisle defeated Southern champion Virginia. In that game Virginia's Bradley Walker once grabbed Hawley Pierce, Carlisle's biggest player, and carried him ten yards with him dangling over his shoulder.

Schedule

References

Carlisle
Carlisle Indians football seasons
Carlisle Football